Marine Forces Pacific (MARFORPAC) is the United States Marine Corps service component command of United States Indo-Pacific Command. It is the largest field command in the Marine Corps and is headquartered at Camp H. M. Smith in Hawaii.

It is composed of the I Marine Expeditionary Force (I MEF) and the III Marine Expeditionary Force (III MEF).  Each MEF comprises a command element (CE), a ground combat element (GCE) (1st and 3rd Marine Divisions), an aviation combat element (ACE) (1st and 3rd Marine Aircraft Wings), and a logistics combat element (LCE) (1st and 3rd Marine Logistics Groups).

Mission
As the assigned service component to United States Indo-Pacific Command area of responsibility, Marine Forces Pacific is responsible for the support, planning, and provision of forces in the PACOM AOR or elsewhere as required and may be designated as an executive agent for standing responsibilities or named operations.

Longstanding missions for MARFORPAC include building partner capacity in support of regional cooperation and capacity-building efforts, as well as the defense of South Korea (via subordinate command MARFORK) and Japan.  Marine Forces Pacific also provided combat units to support Operation Iraqi Freedom and Operation Enduring Freedom.

List of commanders
LtGen Keith J. Stalder
LtGen John F. Goodman
LtGen Earl B. Hailston
LtGen Frank Libutti
LtGen Carlton W. Fulford Jr.
LtGen H. C. Stackpole III
LtGen (later General) Charles C. Krulak who later was selected to be Commandant of the Marine Corps
LtGen Jefferson D. Howell
LtGen Louis H. Wilson Jr. who later was selected to be Commandant of the Marine Corps

See also

United States Indo-Pacific Command
U.S. Marine Forces Central Command

Notes

References

External links

Military units and formations of the United States Marine Corps